Carol-Anne Day (born March 26, 1986) is a Canadian voice actress.

Filmography

Western series
The Little Prince - Rosetta (The Planet of the Trainiacs)

Anime series
Ceres, The Celestial Legend - Chidori Kuruma
Betterman -  Kaori Sweet Seventeen
Cardfight!! Vanguard - Misaki Tokura
Cardfight!! Vanguard G - Misaki Tokura, Chrono Dran
Deltora Quest - Gla-Thon
D.I.C.E. - Marsha Rizarov
Di Gi Charat Nyo! - Rabi~en~Rose / Hikaru Usada
Doki Doki School Hours - Minako Tominaga
Dragon Ball - Teenage Chi-Chi, Akane Kimidori, Cookie, Admirer 2, Cutie Blue, Cutie Pink, Cutie Purple, Female Customer, Julie,  Mystery Fighter, Nurse,  Old Woman, Spectator 2, Spectator A
Dragon Ball GT - Valse
Fancy Lala - Chisa Shinohara
Flame of Recca - Yanagi Sakoshita
Full Moon o Sagashite - Madoka Wakamatsu
Future Card Buddyfight - Paruku Nanana, Misaki Tokura (cameo)
Gintama° - Asaemon Ikeda
Gregory Horror Show - Cactus Girl 
Hoop Days -  Mutsumi Akiyoshi
Hunter × Hunter 1999 version - Menchi
Jubei-chan: The Ninja Girl - Freesia Yagyu
Mobile Fighter G Gundam - Allenby Beardsley
Mobile Suit Zeta Gundam - Four Murasame
My-HiME, My-Otome - Mai Tokiha
Pretty Cure - Regine/Shyla
Scan2Go - PEL, Pansy, Hebina
Strawberry Marshmallow - Nobue Itou
The Law of Ueki - Marilyn Carrey
Tide-Line Blue - Josie
Viper's Creed - Sakurako Kariya
Zoids: Chaotic Century - Fiona/Alisia Lennette
Zoids: Guardian Force - Fiona/Alisia Lennette

Video games
A Hat in Time - Nomads, Cruise Seals
D.I.C.E. - Marsha Rizarov
Dynasty Warriors: Gundam 2 - Four Murasame
Dynasty Warriors: Gundam 3 - Four Murasame
Gregory Horror Show :Soul Collector - Lost Doll/Cactus Girl
Inuyasha: The Secret of the Cursed Mask - Kaname Kururugi
Mega Man Powered Up - Additional Voices
Mobile Suit Gundam: Gundam vs. Zeta Gundam -  Four Murasame
We Love Golf! - Yuki

Film Acting
Malvolio - Viola
Sympathetic Frequencies (Short) - Rebecca

References

External links
 Carol-Anne Day at the CrystalAcids Anime Voice Actor Database
 
 
 
 

Living people
Canadian women singers
Canadian rock guitarists
Canadian video game actresses
Canadian voice actresses
21st-century Canadian guitarists
1986 births
21st-century women guitarists